15th Street station is a subway station in Philadelphia. It is served by SEPTA's Market–Frankford Line and all routes of the subway–surface trolley lines. A free interchange also provides access to the Broad Street Line at City Hall station, which is connected to 15th Street by the Downtown Link underground concourse. The concourse also connects to Regional Rail lines at Suburban Station. It is the busiest station on the Market–Frankford Line, with 29,905 boardings on an average weekday.

The station is in the very heart of Center City Philadelphia. City Hall lies across the street from the station, and attractions as Love Park, the Penn Center area, and the Comcast Center are within walking distance.

History
15th Street was the original eastern terminus of the Market–Frankford subway–elevated, which was opened by the Philadelphia Rapid Transit Company on August 3, 1907, and ran west to 69th Street in Upper Darby. In 1908, the Market–Frankford Line was extended eastward to 2nd Street station, meaning 15th Street was no longer the eastern terminal.

The original routing of the tracks curved around the foundations of the ornate City Hall building above, but was rebuilt into a straightened alignment in the mid-1930s in an effort to improve travel time. In 1936, an underground concourse opened connecting the 15th Street to City Hall station, which had opened eight years prior along with early portions of the Broad Street Line.

In 2003, SEPTA rebuilt the station escalators, for which a lawsuit was filed by the Disabled in Action of Pennsylvania, citing that renovating one critical component would require the rest of the station complex (including the City Hall station on the Broad Street Line) to be renovated for ADA accessibility as per building code requirements. As such, SEPTA would be required to make the station ADA accessible. SEPTA and the City of Philadelphia had been proposing a $100 million refurbishment of City Hall station, which included structural repairs, improvements in lighting and ventilation, aesthetic improvements, as well as ADA improvements; however, this project's progression had stalled due to lack of available funding.

In November 2011, the Central Philadelphia Development Corporation awarded construction contracts totaling $50 million for the restoration of Dilworth Park above the station, following the eviction of the Occupy Philly protesters occupying the area; this contract includes the accessibility improvements for the station. SEPTA awarded construction contracts for the improvements in January 2012. Phase 1 of project consisted of a restoration of the Dilworth Park plaza, creating a "gateway" to the SEPTA transit station and installing elevators connecting to the street and Market–Frankford platforms at 15th Street. Later phases would upgrade 15th Street station, City Hall station, and inter-station connections, as well as bringing them up to ADA-accessibility. The total cost of the project has risen to $55 million, with most of the money coming from a federal grant, with additional contributions by the City of Philadelphia, and non-profit organizations including the William Penn Foundation. The project was originally scheduled to have been completed July 2014, but was delayed due stairways, duct banks, and pipes encountered by construction crews that did not appear in any blueprints. The renovated Dilworth Park opened on September 4, 2014. In 2013, the passage of PA Act 89 (Transportation Funding Law) has allowed SEPTA to move forward with the $147 million BLT Architects-designed renovation of the 15th Street/City Hall station complex.

Construction at 15th Street station began in 2016 and was expected to be complete in 2018, with reconstruction of City Hall station began in 2019. Construction at 15th Street station concluded on October 21, 2019. In addition to new elevators and other infrastructure upgrades, the Market–Frankford platforms received new LED-illuminated artwork by Ray King. The remaining two phases of the project, which will upgrade City Hall station and the corridors between the two stations, is yet to be completed.

Market–Frankford Line platforms

The Market–Frankford Line platforms are attached to the Downtown Link concourse, a series of underground pedestrian walkways that provide access to SEPTA Regional Rail's Suburban Station, the Broad Street Line's Walnut–Locust stations, the PATCO Speedline's 12–13th & Locust and 15–16th & Locust stations, as well as the Market–Frankford Line's own 13th Street, 11th Street, and 8th Street stations. However, no free interchange is available to any of these stations, only the City Hall station on the Broad Street Line can be accessed inside fare control.

Subway–surface trolley platforms
All five subway–surface trolley lines stop at 15th Street station. The trolley platforms are located on either side of the Market–Frankford Line tracks, with the inbound platform south of the MFL and the outbound platform north of it. Because the platforms are located within fare control, riders do not need to tap SEPTA Key cards upon boarding the trolleys like some of the other underground trolley stations.

Station layout

There are four side platforms, two high-level for the Market–Frankford Line and two low-level for the subway–surface trolley lines. The trolley tracks are located slightly below the grade of the Market–Frankford Line tracks, as trolleys loop underneath the MFL at 13th Street station.

Image gallery

References

External links

Dilworth Park entrance from Google Maps Street View
 15th Street entrance from Google Maps Street View
Images from NYCSubway.org

SEPTA Market-Frankford Line stations
SEPTA Subway–Surface Trolley Line stations
Railway stations in Philadelphia
Railway stations in the United States opened in 1907
1907 establishments in Pennsylvania
Railway stations located underground in Pennsylvania